Gilberto Érick Martínez Domínguez  (born 25 September 1985 in Tlalnepantla de Baz) is a Mexican footballer. He currently plays for C.F. Ciudad Juárez.

He played seven games in Clausura 2007.

External links

1985 births
Living people
Mexican footballers
Indios de Ciudad Juárez footballers
Liga MX players
People from Tlalnepantla de Baz
Association footballers not categorized by position